Los Abrigos is a small fishing village in Granadilla de Abona, Tenerife. It has a small harbour, which developers want to expand.

References

Populated places in Tenerife